St. Peter Port South was an electoral district in Guernsey in the Channel Islands. It was created following the Machinery of Government changes which came into effect in 2004.

It consists of the southern part of the parish of St. Peter Port. It is divided from St. Peter Port North by the following roads: Rohais, Les Gravées, The Grange and St. Julian's Avenue.

Polling stations
 The Constables’ Office, Lefebvre Street 
 St. Stephen's Community Centre, St. Stephen's Lane

The district had six Deputies until 2016 when it was reduced to five, which represent the electorate in the States of Guernsey.

Election results

Elections in the 2010s

Elections in the 2000s

See also
 Elections in Guernsey

References

External links
 St Peter Port Deputies 1947 to 2004
 St Peter Port South Deputies from 2004

2004 establishments in Guernsey
2020 disestablishments in Guernsey
Constituencies established in 2004
Constituencies disestablished in 2020
Former electoral districts of Guernsey